Knefastia howelli is a species of sea snail, a marine gastropod mollusk in the family Pseudomelatomidae, the turrids and allies.

Description
The length of the shell attains 31 mm, its diameter 11 mm.

Distribution
This species occurs in the Pacific Ocean off Costa Rica.

References

External links
 Zoologica : scientific contributions of the New York Zoological Society.Eastern Pacific Expeditions of the New York Zoological Society. XLIII. Mollusks from the West Coast of Mexico and Central America Part X; Zoologica v. 36, 1951
 Biolib.cz: Image of Knefastia howelli
 
 Gastropods.com: Knefastia howelli

howelli
Gastropods described in 1951